Ruslan Poiseev (born February 4, 1987) is a Russian Taekwondo athlete who won a bronze medal at the 2015 World Taekwondo Championships.
He won 8-6 in 1/4-Final against Lucas Guzmán but was defeated 12-11 by Farzan Ashourzadeh in the next round.

References

Living people
1987 births
Russian male taekwondo practitioners
European Taekwondo Championships medalists
Place of birth missing (living people)
21st-century Russian people
20th-century Russian people